Heo Hyeon-seok (Hangul: 허현석; born February 3, 1971), better known by his stage name Hyun Jin-young (Hangul: 현진영), is a South Korean singer, rapper, and dancer. He is known for his role in introducing hip-hop music to South Korea.

Hyun is known as the first artist to be signed to SM Entertainment, then operating as S.M. Studio, in 1989. In 1995, his contract was completed and he left SM.

Early life
Hyun has been involved with music since he was a child; his father was a jazz pianist. While growing up in Hannam-dong UN Village (8th US Army Village near the U.S. Army Base), he was introduced to African-American music by American friends. He learned how to sing, dance and rap throughout his childhood. He dropped out of high school at age 16 to become a hip-hop musician.

Career 
He eventually met Lee Soo-man, and Hyun passed Lee's audition since he pulled off the toggichum ('The Roger Rabbit"). He then trained under Lee's supervision to prepare for his debut.

Hyun Jin-young and Wawa
Debuting as Hyun Jin-young and Wawa in 1990, Hyun released hit songs such as "Sad Mannequin", "Sexy Lady" and "You Are in My Unclear Memory". Though album sales were mediocre, he gained popularity as a forerunner of hip hop music in South Korea, which at the time was a shock for most audiences. At first, Wawa consisted of Koo Jun-yup and Kang Won-rae from Clon, later Lee Hyun-do and Kim Sung-jae, both of Deux fame, and finally Sean, a future half of Jinusean. Hyun's career was damaged by a series of drug convictions from which it never fully recovered. He was incarcerated for marijuana use in 1991, then methamphetamines in 1993. Hyun later said he became addicted to methamphetamines after befriending a drug dealer inmate during his first stint in jail. Further arrests followed in 1995 and 1998. In 1997, he formed a hip hop duo named I.W.B.H. with Lee Tak.

Return
In 2001, Hyun returned to the music scene with his fourth solo album, Wild Gangster Hip Hop. The response from his fans was favorable. He checked himself into hospital in 2003 and underwent a drug rehabilitation program. In 2006, he released his fifth album called Street Jazz In My Soul. This album contained jazz music, a departure from his exclusively hip-hop origins. The following year, he began teaching at RAUM, a professional music academy in Gangnam.

He was also a chief producer of SidusHQ.

Personal life
Hyun legally married actress and entrepreneur Oh Seo-un in June 2011. Their wedding ceremony was postponed and took place in 2013.

Discography

Studio albums

Filmography

Television show

References

1971 births
Living people
SM Entertainment artists
IHQ (company) artists
South Korean male rappers
20th-century rappers
20th-century South Korean male singers
21st-century South Korean male singers
South Korean child musicians
South Korean jazz pianists
South Korean jazz singers
South Korean hip hop record producers
South Korean male dancers
South Korean male pop singers
South Korean male singer-songwriters
South Korean record producers
Gimhae Heo clan